Robert Elmer Balaban (born August 16, 1945) is an American actor, author, comedian, director and producer. He was one of the producers nominated for the Academy Award for Best Picture for Gosford Park (2001), in which he also appeared.

Balaban is most known for his appearances in the Christopher Guest comedies Waiting for Guffman (1996), Best in Show (2000), A Mighty Wind (2003), and For Your Consideration (2006) and in the Wes Anderson films Moonrise Kingdom (2012), The Grand Budapest Hotel (2014), Isle of Dogs (2018) and The French Dispatch (2021). Balaban's other film roles include the drama Midnight Cowboy (1969); the science fiction films Close Encounters of the Third Kind (1977), Altered States (1980), 2010 (1984), the comedy Deconstructing Harry (1997), and the historical drama Capote (2005).

Balaban has directed three feature films, in addition to numerous television episodes and films. He is also an author of children's novels.

Early life and education
Balaban was born to a Jewish family on August 16, 1945, in Chicago, Illinois, the son of Eleanor (née Pottasch) and Elmer Balaban, who owned several movie theatres and later was a pioneer in cable television. His mother acted under the name Eleanor Barry. His paternal grandparents emigrated from Russia to Chicago, while his mother's family was from Germany, Russia, and Romania.

His uncles were dominant forces in the theatre business; they founded the Balaban and Katz Theatre circuit in Chicago, a chain which included the Chicago and Uptown Theatres. Balaban's father, Elmer, and uncle, Harry, founded the H & E Balaban Corporation in Chicago, which operated its own movie palaces, including the Esquire Theatre in Chicago. They later owned a powerful group of television stations and cable television franchises. His uncle Barney Balaban was president of Paramount Pictures for nearly 30 years from 1936 to 1964. His maternal grandmother's second husband, Sam Katz, was a vice president at Metro-Goldwyn-Mayer beginning in 1936. Sam had been an early partner of Bob's uncles Abe, Barney, John, and Max in forming Balaban and Katz. Sam served as president of the Publix theatre division of Paramount Pictures.

Balaban began his college career at Colgate University where he joined Phi Kappa Tau fraternity and then transferred to New York University. He studied acting at HB Studio under Uta Hagen.

Acting career
Balaban's first notable role was on stage; he created the role of Linus in the original off-Broadway production of You're A Good Man, Charlie Brown in 1967.

One of his earliest appearances in film was in Midnight Cowboy (1969). In the 1970s, he appeared as Grady Garrett on an episode of Room 222, Orr in Catch-22, Elliot the Organizer in The Strawberry Statement, and the interpreter David Laughlin in the 1977 Steven Spielberg science fiction film Close Encounters of the Third Kind. In 1979, he received a Tony Award nomination for his role in The Inspector General. During the 1980s he appeared in films including Ken Russell's Altered States (1980) and the 1984 2001: A Space Odyssey sequel 2010 (as Dr Chandra, the creator of HAL 9000). He also directed the Randy Quaid horror comedy film Parents, and the Armin Mueller-Stahl drama film The Last Good Time (1994).

Balaban had supporting roles in films such as Absence of Malice, Bob Roberts, Deconstructing Harry, Ghost World, The Majestic, Lady in the Water, and Christopher Guest's Waiting for Guffman, Best in Show, A Mighty Wind, and For Your Consideration.

Balaban appeared in Miami Vice as reporter Ira Stone. In the 1990s, Balaban had a recurring role on the fourth season of Seinfeld as Russell Dalrymple, the fictional president of NBC. He also played Warren Littlefield, a real-world NBC executive, in The Late Shift, about the battle between Jay Leno and David Letterman for NBC's The Tonight Show. His tie to Littlefield continued in 2012 when he read the audiobook of Littlefield's autobiography, Top of the Rock: Inside the Rise and Fall of Must See TV. In 1999, Balaban made a guest appearance in the sitcom Friends as Phoebe Buffay's father Frank in "The One With Joey's Bag". In 2010, Balaban appeared as Judge Clayton Horn, the real-life judge who presided over the obscenity trial of Lawrence Ferlinghetti and City Lights Bookstore in the movie Howl.

In 2001, Balaban produced Gosford Park, for which he received an Academy Award nomination for Best Picture. He also appeared in the movie as Morris Weissman, a Hollywood producer. He appeared in an episode of Entourage as a doctor known for writing prescriptions for medical marijuana. He directed the film Bernard and Doris (2006), starring Susan Sarandon; and also the biopic Georgia O'Keeffe (2009), starring Joan Allen and Jeremy Irons. He has directed several episodes of the Showtime series Nurse Jackie.

In September 2011, he was featured with Morgan Freeman and John Lithgow in the Broadway debut of the play, 8—a staged reenactment of the federal trial that overturned California's Prop 8 ban on same-sex marriage—as Judge Vaughn Walker. The production was held at the Eugene O'Neill Theatre to raise money for the American Foundation for Equal Rights.

In January 2016, Balaban appeared in the short play Milton Bradley by Peter Sagal, for Playing On Air, a non-profit organization that "records short plays [for public radio and podcast] written by top playwrights and performed by outstanding actors."

In early 2021, Balaban provided the voice of the narrator in The Simpsons episode “The Dad-Feelings Limited”.

Writing career
Balaban wrote a series of six children's novels featuring a bionic dog named McGrowl. He also co-authored Spielberg, Truffaut & Me: An Actor's Diary with Steven Spielberg and The Creature from the Seventh Grade: Sink or Swim (Creature from the Seventh Grade, #2) which Andy Rash illustrated.
He also wrote the book, Close Encounters of the Third Kind Diary.

Personal life
Balaban is married to Lynn Grossman; they have two daughters. He resides on the Upper West Side of Manhattan.

Filmography

Film

Television

Director

Theatre

Podcasts

Awards and nominations 
{| class="wikitable"
|-
! Year
! Award
! Category
! Project
! Result
|-
|2001 || Academy Awards || Best Picture || rowspan=2|Gosford Park || 
|-
|2001 || British Academy Film Awards || Outstanding British Film || 
|-
|2009 || Golden Globe Awards || Best Miniseries or Television Film || Bernard and Doris || 
|-
|rowspan=3|2008 || rowspan=4|Primetime Emmy Awards || Outstanding Supporting Actor in a Limited Series or Movie || Recount || 
|-
|Outstanding Television Movie || rowspan=2|Bernard and Doris || 
|-
|rowspan=2|Outstanding Directing for a Limited Series or Movie || 
|-
|2010 || Georgia O'Keeffe || 
|-
|1979 || Tony Awards || Best Featured Actor in a Play || The Inspector General || 
|-
|2001 || rowspan=2|Screen Actors Guild Awards || rowspan=2|Outstanding Ensemble Cast in a Motion Picture || Gosford Park || 
|-
|2005 || Capote || 
|-
|}

Further reading
 Balaban, David. The Chicago Movie Palaces of Balaban and Katz, Arcadia Publishing, 2006
 Balaban, Bob. Spielberg, Truffaut & Me: An Actor's Diary'', Titan Books, 1978 (revised 2002)

References

External links
 
 
 
 
 Bob Balaban interview on AMC-TV's Sci-Fi Department web show
 

1945 births
Male actors from Chicago
American male film actors
American people of German-Jewish descent
American people of Romanian-Jewish descent
American people of Russian-Jewish descent
American male television actors
American television directors
Comedy film directors
Horror film directors
Colgate University alumni
Jewish American male actors
Latin School of Chicago alumni
Living people
Outstanding Performance by a Cast in a Motion Picture Screen Actors Guild Award winners
Film directors from Illinois
20th-century American male actors
21st-century American male actors
Balaban family
People from the Upper West Side
21st-century American Jews
20th-century American Jews